Trenton Holliday is a paleoanthropologist who was involved in the discovery of Homo naledi, found in the Dinaledi Chamber of the Rising Star Cave system in South Africa in 2015. Holliday, along with his team, analyzed the body size and proportions of the fossil.

Holliday is a professor and Anthropology Department Chair at Tulane University in New Orleans, Louisiana, where he teaches human evolution, function morphology, and modern human adaptation and variation. He studies the origins of Homo sapiens, origin of the genus Homo, the fate of the Neanderthals, hybridization among extant mammals, and late Australopithecus.

Holliday got his B.A. in anthropology from Louisiana State University (1988) and M.A. (1991) and Ph.D. (1995) in anthropology in the University of New Mexico.

Selected publications

References

External links 
 Trenton Holliday on ResearchGate

Tulane University faculty
Year of birth missing (living people)
Living people
American paleoanthropologists
Louisiana State University alumni
University of New Mexico alumni